Many bacterial species are named after people, either the discoverer or a famous person in the field of microbiology. For example, Salmonella is named after D.E. Salmon, who discovered it (albeit as "Bacillus typhi").

For the generic epithet, all names derived from people must be in the female nominative case, either by changing the ending to -a or to the diminutive -ella, depending on the name.

For the specific epithet, the names can be converted into either adjectival form (adding -nus (m.), -na (f.), -num (n.) according to the gender of the genus name) or the genitive of the Latinised name.

 Adlercreutzia – H. Adlercreutz, a Finnish professor
 Afifella – S. Afif,  a British philosopher and painter
 Agreia – Nina S. Agre, a Russian microbiologist
 Ahrensia – Ahrens, a German microbiologist
 Akkermansia – Antoon Akkermans (1940–2006), a Dutch microbiologist
 Allisonella – M. J. Allison, an American microbiologist
 Ameyamaea – Minoru Ameyama, a Japanese bacteriologist
 Anderseniella – Valérie Andersen, a French bacteriologist
 Andreprevotia – André Romain Prévot (1894–1982), a French bacteriologist
 Asaia – Toshinobu Asai (1902–1975), a Japanese bacteriologist
 Neoasaia – Toshinobu Asai (1902–1975), a Japanese bacteriologist
 Asanoa – Koso Asano, a Japanese microbiologist
 Austwickia – Peter K.C. Austwick, a New Zealand botanist
 Barnesiella – Ella M. Barnes, British microbiologist
 Bartonella – Alberto L. Barton, Peruvian physician
 Bauldia – John Bauld, an Australian microbiologist
 Beggiatoa – F. S. Beggiato, a physician of Vicenza
 Beijerinckia – Martinus W. Beijerinck, a Dutch microbiologist
 Belliella – Russell Bell, a Swedish aquatic microbiologist
 Belnapia – Jayne Belnap, an American microbiologist
 Beneckea – W. Benecke, a German bacteriologist
 Bergeriella – U. Berger, a German bacteriologist
 Bergeyella – David Hendricks Bergey, an American bacteriologist
 Bermanella – Tom Berman, an Israeli aquatic microbial ecologist
 Bhargavaea – Pushpa Mittra Bhargava, an Indian biologist
 Bibersteinia – Ernst L. Biberstein, an American bacteriologist
 Bizionia – Bartolomeo Bizio, an Italian naturalist
 Blautia – Michael Blaut, a German microbiologist
 Bordetella – Jules Bordet, a Belgian microbiologist
 Borkar – Suresh Borkar, an Indian scientist
 Borrelia – Amédée Borrel, a French scientist
 Bosea – J. C. Bose, the founder of the Bose Institute
 Bowmanella – John P. Bowman, an Australian microbiologist
 Brackiella – Manfred Brack, a German pathologist
 Branhamella – Sara Branham, an American microbiologist
 Brenneria – Don J. Brenner, an American bacteriologist
 Brucella – Sir David Bruce, a Scottish physician
 Buchnera – Paul Buchner, a German biologist
 Bulleidia – Arthur Bulleid, a British oral microbiologist
 Burkholderia – W. H. Burkholder, an American bacteriologist
 Buttiauxella – René Buttiaux, a French bacteriologist
 Castellaniella – Sir Aldo Castellani, a British-Italian bacteriologist
 Catonella – Elizabeth P. Cato, a United States microbiologist
 Chainia – Ernst Boris Mikaelovich Chain, a German/British microbiologist
 Clevelandina – L. R. Cleveland, an American biologist
 Cobetia – Andre B. Cobet, an American bacteriologist
 Cohnella – Ferdinand Cohn, a German microbiologist
 Collinsella – Matthew D. Collins, a British microbiologist
 Colwellia – Rita R. Colwell, an American bacteriologist
 Costertonia – J. W. Costerton, an American bacteriologist
 Couchioplanes – J. N. Couch, an American mycologist
 Cowdria – E. V. Cowdry, an American rickettsiologist
 Coxiella – Herald R. Cox, an American microbiologist
 Crabtreella – K. Crabtree, an American microbiologist
 Crossiella – Thomas Cross, a British microbiologist
 Dasania – Dasan, a Korean scientist
 Deleya – Jozef De Ley, a Belgian microbiologist
 Derxia – H. G. Derx, a Dutch microbiologist
 Devosia – Paul De Vos, a Belgian microbiologist
 Devriesea – L. A. Devriese, a Belgian veterinary microbiologist
 Dickeya – Robert S. Dickey, an American phytopathologist
 Dietzia – Alma Dietz, an American microbiologist
 Dongia – Xiu-Zhu Dong, a Chinese bacteriologist and bacterial taxonomist
 Dorea – Joël Doré, a French microbiologist
 Dubosiella – René Dubos, an American microbiologist
 Duganella – P. R. Dugan, an American microbiologist
 Dyella – Douglas W. Dye, a New Zealand microbiologist
 Edwardsiella – Philip R. Edwards (1901-1966), an American bacteriologist
 Eggerthella – Arnold H. Eggerth, an American bacteriologist
 Paraeggerthella – Arnold H. Eggerth, an American bacteriologist
 Ehrlichia – Paul Ehrlich, a German bacteriologist
 Eikenella – M. Eiken, a Scandinavian biologist
 Elioraea – Eliora Z. Ron, an Israeli microbiologist
 Elizabethkingia – Elizabeth O. King, an American bacteriologist
 Erwinia – Erwin Frink Smith, an American bacteriologist
 Escherichia – Theodor Escherich, a German physician
 Euzebya – Jean P. Euzéby, a French bacteriologist
 Euzebyella – Jean P. Euzéby, a French bacteriologist
 Ewingella – William H. Ewing, an American bacteriologist
 Facklamia – Richard R. Facklam, an American bacteriologist
 Fangia – Xinfang Fang, a Chinese microbiologist
 Finegoldia – S. M. Finegold, an American bacteriologist
 Francisella – Edward Francis, an American bacteriologist
 Frankia – Albert Bernhard Frank, a Swiss microbiologist
 Frateuria – Joseph Frateur, a Belgian microbiologist
 Friedmanniella – E. Imre Friedmann, an American microbiologist
 Fryxelliella - Greta Fryxell, marine scientist known for her work on diatoms
 Gallionella – B. Gallion, a receiver of customs and zoologist (1782–1839) in Dieppe, France
 Garciella – Jean-Louis Garcia, a French microbiologist
 Gardnerella – H. L. Gardner, an American bacteriologist
 Georgfuchsia –  , a German bacteriologist
 Gibbsiella – John N. Gibbs, a British forest pathologist
 Giesbergeria – G. Giesberger, a Dutch microbiologist
 Gillisia – Monique Gillis, a Belgian bacteriologist
 Goodfellowiella (in place of the illegitimate name Goodfellowia) – Michael Goodfellow, a British microbiologist
 Gordonia – Ruth E. Gordon, an American bacteriologist
 Gordonibacter – Jeffrey I. Gordon, an American bacteriologist
 Grahamella – George Stuart Graham Smith, a British microbiologist
 Gramella – Hans Christian Gram, a Danish pharmacologist and pathologist
 Grimontia – Patrick A. D. Grimont, a French microbiologist
 Guggenheimella – Bernhard Guggenheim, a Swiss microbiologist
 Gulbenkiania – Calouste Gulbenkian, a Portuguese protector of the arts and sciences
 Pseudogulbenkiania – alouste Gulbenkian, a Portuguese protector of the arts and sciences
 Haemobartonella – Albert L. Barton, Peruvian physician
 Hahella – Yung Chil Hah, a Korean bacteriologist
 Hallella – Ivan C. Hall, a United States microbiologist
 Hamadaea – Masa Hamada, a Japanese microbiologist
 Hansschlegelia – Hans G. Schlegel, a German microbiologist
 Haslea - Grethe Rytter Hasle, a Norwegian scientist known for her work on diatoms
 Henriciella – Arthur T. Henrici, an American microbiologist
 Hespellia – Robert B. Hespell, an American microbiologist
 Hippea – Hans Hippe, a German microbiologist
 Hirschia – Peter Hirsch, a German microbiologist
 Hoeflea – Manfred Höfle, a German microbiologist
 Holdemania – Lillian V. Holdeman Moore, an American microbiologist
 Hollandina – André Hollande Jr., a French protistologist
 Hongia – Soon-Woo Hong, a Korean microbiologist
 Hongiella – Soon-Woo Hong, a Korean microbiologist
 Howardella – Bernard Howard, a New Zealand microbiologist
 Hoyosella – Manuel Hoyos, a pioneer in the research for the protection of Altamira Cave paintings
 Hylemonella – Philip B. Hylemon, an American bacteriologist
 Hyunsoonleella – Hyun-Soon Lee, a Korean microbiologist
 Ignatzschineria (in place of the illegitimate name Schineria) – Ignaz Rudolph Schiner, an Austrian entomologist
 Imhoffiella – Johannes F. Imhoff, a German microbiologist
 Jahnella – Eduard Adolf Wilhelm Jahn
 Jannaschia – Holger W. Jannasch, a German microbiologist
 Jiangella – Cheng-Lin Jiang, a Chinese microbiologist
 Jishengella – Jisheng Ruan, a Chinese microbiologist
 Johnsonella – John L. Johnson, a United States microbiologist
 Jonesia – Dorothy Jones, a British microbiologist
 Jonquetella – Professor Jonquet, a French clinician
 Joostella – P. J. Jooste, a South African bacteriologist
 Kalamii - Dr. A P J Abdul Kalam, an Indian aerospace scientist & 11th President of India.
 Kangiella – Kook Hee Kang, a Korean microbiologist
 Kerstersia – Karel Kersters, a Belgian microbiologist
 Kingella – Elizabeth O. King, an American bacteriologist
 Kitasatoa – Shibasaburo Kitasato, a Japanese bacteriologist
 Kitasatospora – Shibasaburo Kitasato, a Japanese bacteriologist
 Klebsiella – Edwin Klebs, a German bacteriologist
 Klugiella – Michael J. Klug, an American entomologist/microbiologist
 Kluyvera – Albert Jan Kluyver, a Dutch microbiologist
 Knoellia – Hans Knöll, a German pioneer in antibiotic research
 Kocuria – Miroslav Kocur, a Slovakian microbiologist
 Kofleria – Ludwig Kofler, an Austrian scientist
 Koserella – Stewart A. Koser (1894-1971), an American bacteriologist
 Kozakia – Michio Kozaki, a Japanese microbiologist
 Krasilnikovia – Nikolai Aleksandrovich Krasil'nikov, a Russian actinomycetologist
 Kriegella – Noel R. Krieg, an American microbiologist
 Kurthia – H. Kurth, a German bacteriologist
 Kushneria – Donn Kushner, an American Canadian scientist
 Allokutzneria – Donn Kushner, a Canadian microbiologist
 Kutzneria – Hans-Jürgen Kutzner, a German microbiologist
 Labedella – David P. Labeda, an American bacteriologist
 Labrenzia – Matthias Labrenz, a German marine microbiologist
 Laceyella – John Lacey, a British microbiologist
 Larkinella – John M. Larkin, an American microbiologist
 Lautropia – H. Lautrop, a Danish bacteriologist
 Lawsonia – G. H. K. Lawson, an American bacteriologist
 Leadbetterella – Edward R. Leadbetter, an American microbiologist
 Lebouraia, Marie Lebour, a British marine biologist
 Lebouridinium, Marie Lebour, a British marine biologist
 Lechevalieria – Hubert and Mary Lechevalier, an American microbiologist
 Leclercia – H. Leclerc, a French bacteriologist
 Leeia – Keho Lee, a Korean microbiologist
 Leeuwenhoekiella – Antonie van Leeuwenhoek, a Dutch scientist
 Leifsonia – Einar Leifson, an American microbiologist
 Leisingera – Thomas Leisinger, a Swiss bacteriologist
 Leminorella – Léon Le Minor, a French bacteriologist
 Lentzea – Friedrich A. Lentze, a German microbiologist
 Levinea – Max Levine, an American bacteriologist
 Lewinella – Ralph Lewin, an American bacteriologist
 Lishizhenia – Li Shizhen, a famous Chinese naturalist
 Listeria – Lord Lister, a British surgeon
 Listonella – J. Liston, an American bacteriologist
 Loktanella – Tjhing-Lok Tan from the Alfred Wegener Institute in Bremerhaven
 Luedemannella – G. M. Luedemann, a Russian actinomycetologist
 Mahella – Robert A. Mah, an American microbiologist
 Malikia – Kuhrsheed A. Malik, a German microbiologist
 Mannheimia – Walter Mannheim, a German microbiologist
 Martelella – E. Martel, a French explorer
 Marvinbryantia (in place of the illegitimate name Bryantella) – Marvin P. Bryant, an American microbiologist
 Millisia – Nancy F. Millis, an Australian microbiologist
 Mitsuokella – T. Mitsuoka, a Japanese bacteriologist
 Moellerella – V. Møller, a Danish microbiologist
 Moorella – W. E. C. Moore, an American microbiologist
 Moraxella – Victor Morax, a Swiss ophthalmologist
 Morganella – Harry de Riemer Morgan (1863–1931), a British bacteriologist
 Moritella – Richard Y. Morita, an American microbiologist
 Paramoritella – Richard Y. Morita, an American microbiologist
 Moryella – Francine Mory, a French bacteriologist
 Murdochiella – David A. Murdoch, a British microbiologist
 Nakamurella – Kazonuri Nakamura, a Japanese microbiologist
 Neisseria – Albert Neisser, a German bacteriologist
 Nesterenkonia – Olga Nesterenko, a Ukrainian microbiologist
 Nicoletella – Jacques Nicolet, a Swiss microbiologist
 Nocardia – Edmond Nocard, a French veterinarian and microbiologist
 Nocardioides, Nocardiopsis, Pseudonocardia:
 Nonomuraea – H. Nonomura, a Japanese taxonomist of actinomycetes
 Ohtaekwangia – Oh Tae-Kwang, a Korean microbiologist
 Oerskovia – Jeppe Ørskov, a Danish microbiologist
 Paraoerskovia – Jeppe Ørskov, a Danish microbiologist
 Olleya – June Olley, a British bacteriologist
 Olsenella – Ingar Olsen, a Norwegian microbiologist
 Orenia – Aharon Oren, an Israeli bacteriologist
 Ottowia – Johannes C. G. Ottow, a German bacteriologist
 Owenweeksia – Owen B. Weeks, an American bacteriologist
 Palleronia – Norberto Palleroni, an American bacteriologist
 Pasteurella – Louis Pasteur, a French scientist
 Pasteuria – Louis Pasteur, a French scientist
 Pelczaria – M. J. Pelczar, an American bacteriologist
 Pfennigia – Norbert Pfennig, a German bacteriologist
 Pillotina – J. Pillot, a French microbiologist
 Piscirickettsia – Howard Taylor Ricketts, an American pathologist
 Prauserella – Helmut Prauser, a German microbiologist
 Prevotella – André Romain Prévot, a French bacteriologist
 Paraprevotella:
 Quinella – J. I. Quin, a South African microbiologist
 Rahnella – Otto Rahn, a German-American microbiologist
 Ralstonia – E. Ralston, an American bacteriologist
 Raoultella – Didier Raoult, a French microbiologist
 Rathayibacter – E. Rathay, an Australian plant pathologist
 Reichenbachiella (in place of the illegitimate name Reichenbachia) – Hans Reichenbach, a German microbiologist
 Rheinheimera – Gerhard Rheinheimer, a German marine microbiologist
 Rickettsia – Howard Taylor Ricketts, an American pathologist
 Neorickettsia – Howard Taylor Ricketts, an American pathologist
 Riemerella – Riemer.
 Robinsoniella – Isadore M. Robinson, an American microbiologist
 Rochalimaea – Henrique da Rocha-Lima, a Brazilian bacteriologist
 Roseburia – Theodor Rosebury, an American microbiologist
 Rothia – Genevieve D. Roth, an American bacteriologist
 Ruania – Ji-Sheng Ruan, a Chinese microbiologist
 Ruegeria – Hans-Jürgen Rüger, a German microbiologist
 Rummeliibacillus – John Rummel, an American astrobiologist
 Salmonella – Daniel E. Salmon, a U.S. veterinary surgeon
 Samsonia – Régine Samson, a French phytobacteriologist
 Scardovia – Vittorio Scardovi, an Italian microbiologist
 Aeriscardovia, Parascardovia, Alloscardovia, Metascardovia:
 Schineria – Ignaz Rudolph Schiner, who first described the fly Wohlfahrtia magnifica
 Schlegelella – H. G. Schlegel, a German microbiologist
 Schlesneria – Heinz Schlesner, a German microbiologist
 Schumannella – P. Schumann, a German microbiologist
 Schwartzia – Helen M. Schwartz, a South African rumen physiologist
 Sebaldella – Madeleine Sebald, a French bacteriologist
 Seinonella – Akio Seino, a Japanese microbiologist
 Seliberia – G. L. Seliber, a Russian microbiologist
 Serratia – Serafino Serrati, an Italian monk and physicist
 Sharpea – Michaela E. Sharpe, a British bacteriologist
 Shewanella – J. M. Shewan, a British bacteriologist
 Alishewanella – J. M. Shewan, a British bacteriologist
 Shigella – Kiyoshi Shiga, a Japanese bacteriologist
 Shimazuella – Akira Shimazu, a Japanese microbiologist
 Shimia – Jae H. Shim, a Korean microbiologist
 Shimwellia – J. L. Shimwell.
 Shinella – Yong-Kook Shin, a Japanese microbiologist
 Shuttleworthia – Cyril Shuttleworth, a British microbiologist
 Simiduia – Usio Simidu, a Japanese microbiologist
 Simkania – Arbitrary name formed from the personal name Simona Kahane
 Simonsiella – Hellmuth Simons, a German bacteriologist
 Skermanella – Victor B. D. Skerman, an Australian bacteriologist and taxonomist
 Skermania – Victor B. D. Skerman, an Australian bacteriologist and taxonomist
 Slackia – Geoffrey Slack, a British microbiologist and dental researcher
 Smithella – Paul H. Smith, an American microbiologist
 Sneathia – P. H. A. Sneath, a British bacteriologist
 Sneathiella – P. H. A. Sneath, a British bacteriologist
 Soehngenia – Nicolas L. Soehngen, a Dutch microbiologist
 Soonwooa – Soon-Woo Hong, a Korean microbiologist
 Stackebrandtia – Erko Stackebrandt, a German microbiologist
 Staleya – James T. Staley, an American microbiologist
 Stanierella – Roger Y. Stanier, a Canadian microbiologist
 Stappia – Stapp, a Belgian microbiologist
 Starkeya – Robert L. Starkey, an American bacteriologist
 Stetteria – Karl Otto Stetter, a German biologist
 Sutterella – Vera Sutter, an American bacteriologist
 Parasutterella – Vera Sutter, an American bacteriologist
 Suttonella – R. G. A. Sutton, a British bacteriologist
 Swaminathania – Swaminathan, an Indian biologist
 Tannerella – Anne C. R. Tanner, an American microbiologist
 Tanticharoenia – Morakot Tanticharoen, a Thai bacteriologist
 Tatlockia – Hugh Tatlock, an American microbiologist
 Tatumella – Harvey Tatum, an American bacteriologist
 Taylorella – C. E. D. Taylor, a British bacteriologist
 Terasakiella – Y. Terasaki, a Japanese microbiologist
 Thauera – R. Thauer, a German bacteriologist
 Thorsellia – Walborg Thorsell, a Swedish biologist
 Tindallia – Brian Tindall, a British bacteriologist
 Tistlia – Michael Tistl, a German geologist
 Tissierella – P. H. Tissier, a French bacteriologist
 Tomitella – Fusao Tomita, a Japanese microbiologist
 Trabulsiella – L. R. Trabulsi, a Brazilian bacteriologist
 Truepera – Hans G. Trüper, a German bacteriologist
 Tsukamurella – Michio Tsukamura, a Japanese microbiologist
 Turneriella – Leslie Turner, a British microbiologist
 Umezawaea – Hamao Umezawa, a Japanese bacteriologist
 Uruburuella – Federico Uruburu, a Spanish microbiologist
 Vasilyevaea – Lina Vasilyeva, a Russian microbiologist
 Veillonella – Adrien Veillon (1864-1931), a French bacteriologist
 Vogesella – Otto Voges, a German microbiologist
 Volcaniella – B. Elazari-Volcani, an Israeli bacteriologist
 Wautersia – Georges Wauters, a Belgian microbiologist
 Wautersiella – Georges Wauters, a Belgian microbiologist
 Weeksella – Owen B. Weeks, an American bacteriologist
 Weissella – Norbert Weiss, a German bacteriologist
 Wenxinia – Wen-Xin Chen, a Chinese microbiologist
 Wigglesworthia – V. B. Wigglesworth, a British parasitologist
 Williamsia – Stanley T. Williams, a British microbiologist
 Winogradskyella – Sergey Winogradsky, a Russian microbiologist
 Wolbachia – Simeon B. Wolbach, an American bacteriologist
 Wolinella – M. J. Wolin, an American bacteriologist
 Annwoodia - Ann P. Wood, a British microbiologist
 Xiangella – Hua Xiang,  a Chinese microbiologist
 Yangia – H.-F. Yang, a Chinese microbiologist
 Yaniella (in place of the illegitimate name Yania) – Xun-Chu Yan, a Chinese microbiologist
 Yersinia – Alexandre Yersin, a Swiss bacteriologist
 Yonghaparkia – Yong-Ha Park, a Korean microbiologist
 Yuhushiella – Yuhu Shi, a Chinese microbiologist
 Zavarzinella – Georgii A. Zavarzin, a Russian bacteriologist
 Zavarzinia – Georgii A. Zavarzin, a Russian bacteriologist
 Zhangella – Shu-Zheng Zhang, a Chinese biochemist
 Zhihengliuella – Zhi-Heng Liu, a Chinese microbiologist
 Zhouia – Pei-Jin Zhou, a Chinese microbiologist
 Zimmermannella – O.E.R. Zimmermann, a German microbiologist
 Zobellella – Claude E. ZoBell, an American bacteriologist
 Zobellia – Claude E. ZoBell, an American bacteriologist
 Pseudozobellia – Claude E. ZoBell, an American bacteriologist
 Zooshikella – Zoo Shik Lee, a Korean microbiologist
 Zunongwangia – Zu-Nong Wang, a Chinese microbiologist

See also 
 LPSN, list of accepted bacterial and archaeal names
 List of Archaea genera
 List of Bacteria genera
 List of bacterial genera named after geographical names
 List of bacterial genera named after institutions
 List of bacterial genera named after mythological figures
 List of clinically important bacteria
 List of organisms named after famous people
 List of taxa named by anagrams

References 
 

Bacteria genera
Bacterial genera